The 2017 Super Coppa Sammarinese was played on 20 September 2017, at Campo di Fiorentino in Fiorentino, San Marino.
This was the 6th Super Coppa Sammarinese and was played by Tre Penne, winners of the 2016–17 Coppa Titano, and La Fiorita, winners of the 2016–17 Campionato Sammarinese di Calcio. Tre Penne won 4–0 to win their third Super Coppa Sammarinese.

Route to the final

Tre Penne qualified by winning the 2016–17 Coppa Titano and La Fiorita qualified by winning the 2016–17 Campionato Sammarinese di Calcio.

Details

References

2017
2017–18 in San Marino football